George Edward Given Lyness, usually known as Given Lyness (born 16 December 1937 in Belfast, Northern Ireland) is an Irish former cricketer. A right-handed batsman and off spin bowler, he played three times for the Ireland cricket team in 1961 including one first-class match. He made his debut for Ireland in August 1961, playing against the MCC in a first-class match. The following month, he played twice against Australia in what were his final matches for Ireland, finishing with a record of 13 wickets at an average of 15.69.

References

1937 births
Living people
Irish cricketers
Cricketers from Belfast
Cricketers from Northern Ireland